Callington is a town in Cornwall, England.

Callington may also refer to:
Callington, Cornwall, England
Callington (UK Parliament constituency), a former constituency at Callington, Cornwall
Callington railway station: a disused railway station in Callington, Cornwall
Callington Town F.C.
Callington Community College
Callington, South Australia
Callington Mill, Tasmania, Australia
Callington Road Hospital, Bristol, England